Jhonny Yunus Tagi (born 12 January 2001) is an Indonesian professional footballer who plays as a midfielder for Liga 2 club Persewar Waropen.

Club career

Persipura Jayapura
He was signed for Persipura Jayapura to play in Liga 1 in the 2021 season. Tagi made his league debut on 14 February 2022 as a substitute in a match against Barito Putera at the Kapten I Wayan Dipta Stadium, Gianyar.

Career statistics

Club

Notes

References

External links
 Jhonny Tagi at Soccerway
 Jhonny Tagi at Liga Indonesia

2001 births
Living people
Indonesian footballers
Persipura Jayapura players
Persewar Waropen players
Liga 1 (Indonesia) players
Liga 2 (Indonesia) players
Association football wingers
People from Nabire Regency
Sportspeople from Papua